The PSX Dividend 20 Index is a stock index acting as a benchmark to compare prices on the Pakistan Stock Exchange (PSX) over a period. PSX Dividend 20 Index benchmark top 20 dividend paying companies at PSX based on the last 12-month dividend yield.

History 
From October 2020, PSX Dividend 20 Index was in test run at PSX.

See also 

 KSE 30 Index
 KSE 100 Index
 KMI 30 Index
 CDC

References

External links 

 Bloomberg page for KSE100:IND
 Official Website
 BBC Market Data: KSE-100
 Reuters page for .KSE

Lists of companies of Pakistan
Pakistani stock market indices
Pakistan Stock Exchange
Investment